This is a list of medieval statutes and other laws issued under royal authority in the Kingdom of England before the development of Parliament.  These instruments are not considered to be Acts of Parliament, which can be found instead at the List of Acts of the Parliament of England.

11th century
Laws of William the Conqueror 1070–1087
One God to be revered throughout the whole realm; peace and security to be preserved between English and Normans
Oath of loyalty
Protection of the King's Peace
Frenchmen to pay "scot and lot"
Live cattle to be sold in cities
Defence of French allegations of offences
Hold the law of King Edward
Freeman's pledge and surety 
Prohibition on the sale of any man by another outside the country
Forbidding killings and hangings
Writ concerning spiritual and temporal courts c. 1072
Writ concerning conduct of sheriffs c. 1077
Coronation Charter 1100 
Freedom of the Church of God
Redemption of lands by just and lawful "relief"
Marriage
Dower
Common mintage
Pardon of Debts and Fees owing to the King's brother
Bequeathments of barons' properties
Forfeiture by barons or the King's men
Remission of all murder-fines incurred before the crowning of the King
Retention of forests
Relieving Knight's burden on their land
Peace to be kept in all the kingdom
Restoration of the law of King Edward
Return of lands belonging to the King

12th century
Charter concerning the holding of courts of shire and hundred 1108–1111
Charter on confirmation of laws c. 1135
Charter on liberties of church 1136
Charter describing the Treaty of Winchester 1153
Charter on confirmation of liberties 1154
Constitutions of Clarendon 1164 
Writ of Henry II addressed to the bishops of England 1164
Assize of Clarendon 1166
Charter of Henry II granting Meath to Hugh of Lassy 1172
Assize of Northampton 1176
Assize of Arms 1181
Assize of the Forest 1184
Ordinance of the Saladin Tithe 1188

13th century
Magna Carta 1215
Magna Carta 1216
Magna Carta 1217
Charter of the Forest 1217
 Magna Carta 1225
 Charter of the Forest 1225
 Statute concerning the Jews 1233
 Statute of Jewry 1253
Royal ordinance on alienation by tenants-in-chief 1256
Proclamation of 18 October 1258
Assize of Bread and Ale 1267
Grant of custom on exported wool, woolfells and hides 1275
Statute of the Jewry 1275
Distraint of knighthood 1278
Statute of Mortmain 1279
Statute of Mortmain 1290

References

List of English statutes repealed in ireland (PDF format)

See also
 List of Acts of the Parliament of England to 1483
 List of Acts of the Parliament of England, 1485–1601
 List of Acts of the Parliament of England, 1603–1641
 List of Acts of the Parliament of England, 1660–1699
 List of Acts of the Parliament of England, 1700–1706

Statutes
Statutes
England
Statutes
Statutes